Granddaddy Creek (also called Grand Daddys Branch) is a stream in  Henry County, Missouri.

The stream turns to the southeast past Piper to its confluence with Deepwater Creek within the upper reaches of Montrose Lake within the Montrose Conservation Area.

The creek was named after W. A. "Grandaddy" Gates, an early settler.

See also
List of rivers of Missouri

References

Rivers of Henry County, Missouri
Rivers of Missouri